Kevi (in Serbian: Кеви or Kevi, in Hungarian: Kevi) is a village in Serbia. It is situated in the Senta municipality, in the North Banat District, Vojvodina province. The village has a Hungarian ethnic majority (96.95%) and its population numbering 887 people (2002 census).

See also
List of places in Serbia
List of cities, towns and villages in Vojvodina

Places in Bačka
Senta